Cranberry Pond is located northwest of Raquette Lake, New York. Fish species present in the pond are brook trout, brown trout, white sucker, sunfish and black bullhead. There is access by trail from Brown Tract Road. No motors are allowed on the pond.

References

Lakes of New York (state)
Lakes of Hamilton County, New York